Joshua Matthew Sills (born January 26, 1998) is an American football offensive guard for the Philadelphia Eagles of the National Football League (NFL). He played college football at West Virginia and Oklahoma State.

Early life and education
Sills was born on January 26, 1998, and grew up in Sarahsville, Ohio. He attended Meadowbrook High School in Byesville, and was a two-year starter. He committed to West Virginia University, and spent his first year as a redshirt.

As a freshman in 2017, Sills played in 13 games and was a starter in 10, five of those at left guard and the other five at right guard. He appeared on 681 snaps and led the team with 13 knockdown blocks. Sills started 12 games in 2018, seeing action on 970 plays and being named second-team All-Big 12 Conference at the end of the season. He started two games in 2019 but missed the rest of the season.

Sills transferred to Oklahoma State University for the 2020 season. He started all 11 games that year and was a first-team All-Big 12 Conference pick. He announced he would return to the team for his senior year in January 2021. As a senior, he was voted team captain and led the Oklahoma State in both knockdown blocks with 41 and pancake blocks with 21, earning a first-team All-Big 12 selection for the second consecutive year. He also received several votes for Big 12 Offensive Lineman of the Year, but did not win the award.

Professional career

Sills declared for the NFL Draft on January 5, 2022. He went unselected in the draft, but was later signed by the Philadelphia Eagles as an undrafted free agent. He was one of three 2022 undrafted players to make the Eagles' final roster, along with Reed Blankenship and Josh Jobe. Sills played in only one game as a rookie, appearing on several special teams snaps in week five against the Arizona Cardinals.

Sills was placed on the commissioner's exempt list on February 1, 2023, shortly before the Super Bowl, after his indictment for rape and kidnapping charges.

Personal life

On January 31, 2023, Sills was indicted by a grand jury in Guernsey County, Ohio on rape and kidnapping charges stemming from allegations that he forcibly restrained and raped a woman in December 2019.

References

Further reading

External links
 Philadelphia Eagles bio
 West Virginia Mountaineers bio
 Oklahoma State Cowboys bio

1999 births
Living people
American football offensive guards
Players of American football from Ohio
West Virginia Mountaineers football players
Oklahoma State Cowboys football players
People from Noble County, Ohio
Philadelphia Eagles players